This is an overview of the  of the Eocene Messel Formation as explored by the Messel Pit excavations in Germany. A former quarry and now UNESCO World Heritage Site, the Messel Formation preserves what once were a series of anoxic lakes surrounded by a sub-tropical rainforest during the Middle Eocene, approximately 47 Ma.

Sponges

Molluscs

Crustaceans

Arachnids

Araneae

Opiliones

Insects

Coleoptera

Dictyopterans

Dipterans

Hemiptera

Hymenoptera

Lepidoptera

Neuroptera

Odonata

Phasmatodea

"Fish"

Amiiformes

Anguilliformes

Lepisosteiformes

Perciformes

Thaumaturidae

Amphibians

Caudata

Anura

Squamata

Testudinata

Crocodyliformes

Birds

Palaeognathae

Anseriformes

Galliformes

Mirandornithes

Cuculiformes

Strisores

Charadriiformes

Gruimorphae

Suliformes

Pelecaniformes

Strigiformes

Coraciimorphae

Cariamiformes (?)
Several groups of Messel birds share characteristics with the modern seriemas, which has led to them being placed within the clade Cariamae in the past. However, this placement typically occurred under the assumption that they are a group within gruiformes, which has been disputed by more recent analysis. Instead more recent publications consider Cariamae (or Cariamiformes) as basal members of Australaves.

Falconiformes

Psittacopasserae

Incertae sedis

Mammals

Apatotheria

Artiodactyla

Chiroptera

Cimolesta

Eulipotyphla

Leptictida

Metatheria

Pan-Carnivora

Pholidota

Perissodactyla

Primates

Rodentia

References

Eocene life
Natural history of Germany
Eocene animals of Europe
Messel Pit
Messel Pit